Universidad del Azuay (UDA) is an Ecuadorian university located in the Province of Azuay, its campus are in the city of Cuenca and in the parish of Baños.

The university was founded in 1968 as part of the Universidad Católica de Santiago de Guayaquil in the city of Cuenca under the name of the "Institute of Philosophy and Educational Sciences". It was  authorized by the Holy See on May, 1969.

The Institute began its activities in the 1968–1969 academic year, the founding professors were Francisco Olmedo Llorente, Claudio Malo González, Carlos Pérez Agustí, Rafael Galiana, José Castelví Queralt and Nelson Yánez Ortega. The first cohort had around sixty students, but not all of them graduated.

The priest Agustín López Canessa became the first director of the institute, he was delegated by the Archbishop of Cuenca.

In December 1970, the School of Accounting was founded and the institute was renamed as Universidad Católica Santiago de Guayaquil in Cuenca. Claudio Malo González was named as Academic Director.

Later, the two academic departments of the Universidad Católica de Santiago de Guayaquil in Cuenca (the Institute of Philosophy and Educational Sciences and the School of Accounting) requested their annexation to the Pontificia Universidad Católica del Ecuador, which took place on November, 1976, which led the academic units to become the Faculty of Philosophy, Letters and Education Sciences and the Faculty of Accounting and Administration Sciences, respectively.
In 1990, after meeting all the legal requirements, it was renamed as Universidad del Azuay, being its current name. Nowadays, the university has incorporated six Faculties and more than 20 careers.

Faculties and Schools 
Faculty of Administration Sciences 
 Business Administration
 Accounting and Auditing
 Economics
 Engineering in Computer Science
 Marketing
Faculty of Legal Sciences
 Law
 International Studies
Faculty of Science and Technology
 Biology
 Civil Engineering
 Production Engineering
 Electronic Engineering
 Food Engineering
 Engineering in Automotive Mechanics
 Mining Engineering
 Environmental Engineering
Faculty of Design, Architecture and Art
 Architecture
 Theatre 
 Interior Design
 Product Design
 Graphic Design
 Textile Design 
Faculty of Philosophy, Letters and Education Sciences 
 Communication
 Basic Education
 Initial Education
 Clinical Psychology
 Educational Psychology
 Organizational Psychology
 Tourism 
Faculty of Medicine 
 Medicine

Since 2012, the university is member of the Ecuadorian Network for Research and Postgraduate Studies.

Rectors of Universidad del Azuay

See also 

 List of universities in Ecuador
 Universidad de Cuenca
 Education in Ecuador

References 

Universities in Ecuador
Cuenca, Ecuador
1968 establishments in South America